Ecchlorolestes is a genus of large damselflies in the family Synlestidae.

The genus contains only two species:
Ecchlorolestes nylephtha  - Queen Malachite
Ecchlorolestes peringueyi  - Marbled Malachite

References

 
Synlestidae
Zygoptera genera
Taxonomy articles created by Polbot